Gillian Pamela Horovitz (née Adams) (born 7 June 1955 in Bromley, Kent) is an English female retired long-distance runner.

Athletics career
She competed in the late 1970s and early 1980s in the women's marathon and won the 1980 Paris Marathon. She represented England in the marathon, at the 1998 Commonwealth Games in Kuala Lumpur, Malaysia.

Personal life
Born as Gillian Adams she was married to American screenwriter Israel Horovitz, author of more than 50 produced plays.

Achievements

References

athlinks
ARRS
imdb
gbrathletics

1955 births
Living people
British female long-distance runners
British female marathon runners
Paris Marathon female winners
Place of birth missing (living people)
Athletes (track and field) at the 1998 Commonwealth Games
Commonwealth Games competitors for England
20th-century British women